DQ3 may be:

 Deltora Quest 3, a children's book
 Dragon Quest III, a console role-playing game (RPG)
 HLA-DQ3, a human leukocyte antigen of the HLA-DQ type.